Vezmeleh (also Romanized as Vezmaleh; also known as Vazmaleh Pahlavi Dezh, Vīzmālā, and Vīzmeleh) is a village in Buin Rural District, Nanur District, Baneh County, Kurdistan Province, Iran. At the 2006 census, its population was 235, in 34 families. The village is populated by Kurds.

References 

Towns and villages in Baneh County
Kurdish settlements in Kurdistan Province